El Granado is a town and municipality located in the province of Huelva, Spain. According to the 2008 census, the municipality has a population of 598 inhabitants.

References

Municipalities in the Province of Huelva